Callinectes is a genus of crabs, containing 16 extant species, including the Atlantic blue crab, C. sapidus:

Extant species

References

External links

 

Portunoidea
Taxa named by William Stimpson
Decapod genera